Simona Spiridon (née Popa; born 1 February 1980 in Roman, Romania) is a Romanian-Austrian handballer who plays for the Austrian club Hypo Niederösterreich. She is also member of the Austrian national team.

Career
Romanian born Spiridon moved to Austria in 2001 when she signed for Hypo Niederösterreich. Having gained Austrian citizenship, her first outing with her new national team came in 2004, at a tournament in the Ukraine where they defeated Belarus. Averaging 3 goals per match, Spiridon has scored over 368 goals in 98 international appearances.

Her club successes are well documented. With Romania, she has picked up two gold medals in younger age category World and European Championships in addition to the 4 Hungarian Cup and 5 Austrian Cup titles. Spiridon has also made it to the EHF Champions League Final 2009 against Viborg and semi-final on four occasions.

Since autumn 2012 Spiridon worked at Hypo Niederösterreich as a youth coach, at the beginning of the season 2013/14 she was reactivated in Hypo's squad. In the begin of 2014 she ended her active career. In summer 2014 she will start working as a coach at the ÖHB.

References

1980 births
Living people
People from Roman, Romania
Austrian female handball players
Austrian people of Romanian descent
Romanian female handball players
Expatriate handball players
Austrian expatriate sportspeople in Hungary
Austrian expatriate sportspeople in Russia
Győri Audi ETO KC players